Kyriakos Antoniou (born 7 May 2001) is a Cyprian professional footballer who plays as a defender for AEZ Zakakiou in the Cypriot Second Division.

Career statistics

References

External links 

 Kyriakos Antoniou on Pafos' website

2001 births
Living people
Association football defenders
Pafos FC players
AEZ Zakakiou players
Cypriot footballers